James Harris (January 3, 1777 – February 26, 1848) was a farmer and political figure in Nova Scotia. He represented Horton township in the Nova Scotia House of Assembly from 1826 to 1836.

He was born in Horton, Nova Scotia, the son of James Harris and Anne Rathburn. Harris married Mary McLatchy. He served as a justice of the peace. Harris died in Horton at the age of 71.

References 
 

1777 births
1848 deaths
Nova Scotia pre-Confederation MLAs